Turpial Airlines C.A. is a Venezuelan airline that has its hub at Arturo Michelena International Airport in Valencia, Venezuela. This airline has a fleet of 3 Boeing 737-400 authorized to operate regular and non-regular flights of passengers, cargo  and mails within the nation, as well as internationally.

History
Turpial Airlines was founded on March 15, 2016, beginning its operations on April 7, 2017 with national routes that include Valencia, Maracaibo and Porlamar, additionally with Panama City being its first international destination.

Destinations

, Turpial operates services to the following destinations:

Fleet

Turpial Airlines includes the following aircraft as of January 2021:

See also
List of airlines of Venezuela

References

External link

Airlines of Venezuela
Venezuelan companies established in 2016
Airlines established in 2016

Airlines